is a Japanese-American model, tarento, and newscaster. Her original stage name was Saya until 2011. Her father is an American with Native American Cherokee heritage and her mother is Japanese.

Ichikawa is represented by the agency Super Continental.

Biography
Ichikawa was born in Nagoya, Aichi Prefecture, and she grew up in Detroit between the ages of four and thirteen. She was accepted to Columbia University, University of Chicago, and New York University. Ichikawa planned on attending Columbia University, but she delayed college for one year in order to focus on her modelling career. Ichikawa was scheduled to return to the United States after the one year, but she enjoyed her career and decided to stay in Japan. She later graduated from Waseda University in 2010. 

Ichikawa was accepted as an exclusive model for the magazines Vivi and 25ans at the age of sixteen, and she is currently active in a number of fashion magazines. She had modeled in the magazines Sumo Fan, sweet, More, Baila, and Maquia.

In the 4 April 2016 Ichikawa became an MC in the Fuji Television informational news programme Your Time.

Bibliography

Magazines

Advertisements

Jacket photos

Publications

Music

Charms

Photobooks

Books

Filmography

Films

TV series
News programmes

Informal programmes

Music programmes

Cultural programmes

Variety programmes

Radio

Music videos

Others

Charity activities

Lectures

References

External links
 

Japanese female models
American female models
People in rail transport
Japanese people of American descent
Japanese people of Cherokee descent
American people of Japanese descent
American people of Cherokee descent
Japanese expatriates in the United States
1987 births
Living people
People from Nagoya
Waseda University alumni